Khalaj is a Turkic language spoken in Iran. Although it contains many old Turkic elements, it has become widely Persianized.  Khalaj has about 150 words of uncertain origin.

Surveys have found that most young Khalaj parents do not pass the language on to their children; only 5% of families teach their children the language.

Khalaj language is a descendant of an old Turkic language called Arghu. The 11th century Turkic lexicographer Mahmud al-Kashgari was the first person to give written examples of the Khalaj language, which are mostly interchangeable with modern Khalaj.

Gerhard Doerfer, who rediscovered Khalaj, demonstrated that it was an independent branch from Common Turkic.

Classification
The Turkic languages are a language family of at least 35 documented languages spoken by the Turkic peoples.

While initially thought to be closely related to Azerbaijani, linguistic studies, particularly those done by Gerhard Doerfer, led to the reclassification of Khalaj as a distinct non-Oghuz branch of the Turkic language family. Evidence for the reassignment includes the preservation of the vowel length contrasts found in Proto-Turkic (PT), word-initial *h, and the lack of the sound change *d → y characteristic of Oghuz languages.

The preservative character of Khalaj can be seen by comparing the same words across different Turkic varieties. For example, in Khalaj, the word for "foot" is hadaq, while the cognate word in nearby Oghuz languages is ayaq (compare Turkish ayak). Because of the preservation of these archaic features, some scholars have speculated that the Khalaj people are the descendants of the Arghu Turks.

Ethnologue and ISO formerly listed a Northwestern Iranian language named "Khalaj" with the same population figure as the Turkic language. The Khalaj speak their Turkic language and Persian, and the supposed Iranian language of the Khalaj is spurious.

Geographical distribution

Khalaj is spoken mainly in Markazi Province in Iran. Doerfer cites the number of speakers as approximately 17,000 in 1968, and 20,000 in 1978. Ethnologue reports that the population of speakers grew to 42,107 by 2000.

Dialects
The main dialects of Khalaj are Northern and Southern. Within the dialect groupings, individual villages and groupings of speakers have distinct speech patterns.

The linguistic difference between the most distant dialects is not smaller (or even bigger) than Kazan Tatar and Bashkir or between Rumelian Turkish and Azerbaijani.

Phonology

Consonants

Vowels

Doerfer claims that Khalaj retains three vowel lengths postulated for Proto-Turkic: long (e.g. 'blood'), half-long (e.g. 'head'), and short (e.g. 'horse'). However, Alexis Manaster Ramer challenges both the interpretation that Khalaj features three vowel lengths and that Proto-Turkic had the same three-way contrast.

Grammar

Morphology

Nouns
Nouns in Khalaj may receive a plural marker or possessive marker. Cases in Khalaj include genitive, accusative, dative, locative, ablative, instrumental, and equative.

Forms of case suffixes change based on vowel harmony and the consonants they follow. Case endings also interact with possessive suffixes. A table of basic case endings is provided below:

Verbs
Verbs in Khalaj are inflected for voice, tense, aspect, and negation. Verbs consist of long strings of morphemes in the following array:

Stem + Voice + Negation + Tense/Aspect + Agreement

Syntax
Khalaj employs subject–object–verb word order. Adjectives precede nouns.

Vocabulary

The core of Khalaj vocabulary is Turkic, but many words have been borrowed from Persian. Words from neighboring Turkic languages, namely Azerbaijani, have also made their way into Khalaj.

For example, Khalaj numbers are Turkic in form, but some speakers replace the forms for "80" and "90" with Persian terms.

Examples
Excerpt from Doerfer & Tezcan 1994, transliterated by Doerfer:

Notes

References

Sources

Books

Book chapters, journal articles, encyclopedia entries

Further reading

 Bulut, Christiane. "The Turkic varieties of Iran". In: The Languages and Linguistics of Western Asia: An Areal Perspective. Edited by Geoffrey Haig and Geoffrey Khan. Berlin, Boston: De Gruyter Mouton, 2019. pp. 398-444. https://doi.org/10.1515/9783110421682-013
  Accessed 3 Jan. 2023.

  Accessed 3 Jan. 2023.

  Accessed 3 Jan. 2023.
  Accessed 3 Jan. 2023.

External links
 Resources in and about the Turkic Khalaj language
 Khalaj language

Agglutinative languages
Turkic languages
Languages of Iran